Gas House Kids is a 1946 American comedy-drama film directed by Sam Newfield and starring Robert Lowery, Billy Halop and Teala Loring. It was followed by two sequels, Gas House Kids Go West and Gas House Kids in Hollywood, both released in 1947. In the film, a group of unruly New York City children from the Gas House District battle a criminal gang. Along with several other series made at the time, it was inspired by the Dead End Kids.

Cast
 Robert Lowery as Eddie O'Brien  
 Billy Halop as Tony Albertini  
 Teala Loring as Colleen Flanagan 
 Carl Switzer as Sammy Levine  
 David Reed as Pat Flanagan  
 Rex Downing as Mickey Papopalous
 Rocco Lanzo as Gus Schmidt 
 Hope Landin as Mrs. O'Brien 
 Ralph Dunn as Detective O'Hara 
 Paul Bryar as Shadow Sarecki  
 Charles C. Wilson as Inspector Shannon

References

Bibliography
 The American Film Institute Catalog of Motion Pictures Produced in the United States: Feature Films, 1941 - 1950: Feature Films. University of California Press, 1999.

External links
 

1946 films
American comedy-drama films
American black-and-white films
1946 comedy-drama films
1940s English-language films
Films directed by Sam Newfield
Producers Releasing Corporation films
1940s American films